The 2023 Friuli-Venezia Giulia regional election will take place on 2-3 April 2023. The election will take place concurrently with the municipal election in 19 comuni of the Region.

Electoral system

Number of councilors 
The Special Statute provides that the number of the regional councilors is determinated by one every 25,000 inhabitants or fraction greater than 10,000, according to the data taken by the last official detection of Istat. In the 2018 election, 47 councilors were elected in the constituencies, while 1 was the seat for the president and 1 was the seat for the "best loser", the first losing candidate.

Majority bonus 
Following the regional electoral law, becomes President the candidate that obtains the greater amount of valid votes. The lists that are accepted in the distribution of seats are the ones that: 

 obteined at least 4% of the regional votes
 obtained at least 1,5% of the regional votes and are in a coalition that obtained at least 15% of the votes
 obtained at least 20% of the votes in one of the constituencies

The winning coalition has to have at least 55% of the seats if the president is elected with less than 45% of votes, and if the votes of the winning candidate are more than 45%, his/her coalition has to have at least 60% of the seats.

Seat for the Slovenian minority 
The lists that represent the Slovenian minority must have at least one seat if they obtained 1% or more votes.

Constituencies 
The territory of the region is divided in 5 constituencies: Trieste, Gorizia, Udine, Tolmezzo and Pordenone.

How to vote 
There are 4 different ways to vote:

 Choosing only a candidate for president, drawing a sign on the name of the candidate
 Choosing a candidate and a list, drawing a sign on the name of the candidate and on the list symbol. The split vote is allowed.
 Choosing a candidate, a list and expressing a preference for a list candidate.
 Choosing only a list; in this case the vote automatically counts as a vote for the candidate for president of the chosen list.

Parties and candidates

References 

Elections in Friuli-Venezia Giulia
2023 elections in Italy